The 2017 DC Solar 200 was the fourth stock car race of the 2017 NASCAR Xfinity Series season and the 13th iteration of the event. The race was held on Saturday, March 18, 2017, in Avondale, Arizona at Phoenix International Raceway, a 1-mile (1.6 km) permanent low-banked tri-oval race track. The race took the scheduled 200 laps to complete. At race's end, Justin Allgaier, driving for JR Motorsports, would pull away on the final restart with four to go to win his fourth career NASCAR Xfinity Series win and his first of the season. To fill out the podium, Ryan Blaney of Team Penske and Erik Jones of Joe Gibbs Racing would finish second and third, respectively.

Background 

Phoenix International Raceway – also known as PIR – is a one-mile, low-banked tri-oval race track located in Avondale, Arizona. It is named after the nearby metropolitan area of Phoenix. The motorsport track opened in 1964 and currently hosts two NASCAR race weekends annually. PIR has also hosted the IndyCar Series, CART, USAC and the Rolex Sports Car Series. The raceway is currently owned and operated by International Speedway Corporation.

The raceway was originally constructed with a 2.5 mi (4.0 km) road course that ran both inside and outside of the main tri-oval. In 1991 the track was reconfigured with the current 1.51 mi (2.43 km) interior layout. PIR has an estimated grandstand seating capacity of around 67,000. Lights were installed around the track in 2004 following the addition of a second annual NASCAR race weekend.

Entry list 

*Withdrew due to fellow driver B. J. McLeod convincing Bilicki that the car was a safety hazard and should not be run.

Practice

First practice 
The first practice session was held on Friday, March 17, at 10:00 AM PST, and would last for 55 minutes.

Second practice 
The second practice session was held on Friday, March 17, at 1:00 PM PST, and would last for 55 minutes.

Third and final practice 
The third and final practice session, sometimes referred to as Happy Hour, was held on Friday, March 17, at 3:00 PM PST, and would last for 55 minutes.

Qualifying 
Qualifying would take place on Saturday, March 18, at 10:05 AM PST. Since Phoenix International Raceway is under 2 miles (3.2 km), the qualifying system was a multi-car system that included three rounds. The first round was 15 minutes, where every driver would be able to set a lap within the 15 minutes. Then, the second round would consist of the fastest 24 cars in Round 1, and drivers would have 10 minutes to set a lap. Round 3 consisted of the fastest 12 drivers from Round 2, and the drivers would have 5 minutes to set a time. Whoever was fastest in Round 3 would win the pole.

No drivers would fail to qualify.

Full qualifying results

Race results 
Stage 1 Laps: 45

Stage 2 Laps: 45

Stage 3 Laps: 110

Standings after the race 

Drivers' Championship standings

Note: Only the first 12 positions are included for the driver standings.

References 

2017 NASCAR Xfinity Series
NASCAR races at Phoenix Raceway
March 2017 sports events in the United States
2017 in sports in Arizona